The 1990–91 UCLA Bruins men's basketball team represented the University of California, Los Angeles in the 1990–91 NCAA Division I men's basketball season. Jim Harrick, for the third year, was the head coach for the Bruins. The Bruins started the season ranked 11th in the AP Poll and won their first 8 games. They finished in 2nd place in the Pac-10 with the same conference record as the previous year, 11–7. UCLA went on to the NCAA tournament, where they upset by Penn State 69–74. UCLA finished ranked 14th and 16th in the UPI and AP Polls respectively.

Starting lineup

Roster

Schedule

|-
!colspan=12 style="background:#;"| Great Alaska Shootout

|-
!colspan=9 style=|Regular Season

|-
!colspan=12 style="background:#;"| NCAA tournament

Source

References

UCLA Bruins men's basketball seasons
UCLA
UCLA
NCAA
NCAA